The Asian Beach Handball Championship is the official competition for senior men's and women's national beach handball teams of Asia.

Men

Summary

Medal table

Participating nations

Women

Summary

Medal table

Participating nations

References

External links
 asianhandball.com

Beach handball competitions
Beach_Handball_Championship
Recurring sporting events established in 2004